Mahagamage Samson Fernando, (4 March 1936 - 9 April 1994), popularly as M. S. Fernando, was a Sri Lankan singer and musician. He is a major player in the development of Baila music and was widely popular among Sri Lankan audiences commonly referred to as the "Baila Chakkrawarthi" (Baila emperor).

Personal life
Fernando was born on 4 March 1936 in Moratuwa to Laron Fernando and Lilee Gomes as the eldest child of the family. He attended St. Anthony's College, Wattala and Christ Church College, Dehiwela. He had three younger sisters and one younger brother. 

Fernando was married to Tulin Fernando and has 7 Children: Susil, Telina, Shantha, Sarath, Sujitha, Sujeewa and Sunimal. Fernando also has 17 Grandchildren.

Career
Fernando studied under veteran musician J. A. Sathiadasan. He debuted as a singer with the duet, "Malak Kada Konde Gasala," done with Pushparani Ariyaratne. It was written by Karunaratne Abeysekera.  The song became popular and allowed Fernando to become a playback singer. His first song in the field, "Sili Siliye Nava Suvandak," for the 1964 film Sasaraka Hati, sang with was also a success. Fernando would eventually lend his voice to over 150 films. He also pursued an acting career appearing in over 25 films and several teledramas, most notably Udagira. He made duets with Angeline Gunathilake in several films such as: Geetha, Hathara Denama Surayo, Edath Adath Suraya, Sujeewa, Ava Soya Adare and Sergeant Nallathambi.

Fernando received many accolades in his long career including the Golden Lotus Award presented by Sri Lankan President William Gopallawa in 1973 and over 159 silver trophies in various Baila contests he entered. He was able to sing in five languages and incorporated dancing into his act. Fernando performed in England, France, Australia, Canada, Singapore and Middle East to Sri Lankan audiences.

After 23 days of treatment at the hospital, he later made playback in the film Maruwa Samaga Vase directed by Titus Thotawatte and film Sasara  by K.A.W. Perera. Meanwhile, he has acted in more than 25 films especially with supportive roles. In 1972, he sang the song "Punchi Panchi Kale" for the film Hithaka Pipunu Mal, which shows another level of his singing ability. In 1974, he sang the popular song "Rosa Kekula Rosa" along with H. R. Jothipala for the film Lasanda. In 1975, Fernando made the song "Dili Dili Dilisena Eliyak" for the film Sikuru Liya under the music by Clarence Wijewardena. For the film Nedeyo in 1976, he made vocals with Latha Walpola for the song "A Rankanda Pemkanda", composed by George Leslie.

The Sinhala Baila song Pissu Vikare (Dagena Polkatu Male) by H. R. Jothipala, Milton Perera, M. S. Fernando is a cover version of the Tamil song Dingiri Dingale (Meenachi) from the 1958 Tamil film Anbu Engey. And it was covered again in Sinhala as a folk song named Digisi/Digiri Digare (Kussiye Badu).

In solo singing, the majority of the songs sung by Fernando showcased his experience drawn from rural or urban life or the news of life, including the popular song Mama Taxikaraya. In the morning of his date of death, he attended a musical concert in the Jawatte, Colombo.

Filmography

References

1936 births
1994 deaths
20th-century Sri Lankan male singers
Sinhalese singers